Jan's snail-eater (Dipsas alternans), is a non-venomous snake found in Brazil.

References

Dipsas
Snakes of South America
Endemic fauna of Brazil
Reptiles of Brazil
Reptiles described in 1885
Taxa named by Johann Gustav Fischer